The 1984–85 Hartford Whalers season was the Whalers' sixth season in the National Hockey League.

Offseason
On May 29, the Whalers acquired defenseman Brad Shaw from the Detroit Red Wings for an eighth round draft pick in the 1984 NHL Entry Draft. Shaw played with the Ottawa 67's during the 1983–84 season, scoring 12 goals and 78 points in 63 games. Shaw also participated with Canada at the 1984 World Junior Ice Hockey Championships, where he had two assists in seven games. Shaw was a fifth round draft pick for Detroit at the 1982 NHL Entry Draft.

On June 9, Hartford selected defenseman Sylvain Cote in the first round, 11th overall pick, at the 1984 NHL Entry Draft held at the Montreal Forum. Cote scored 15 goals and 65 points with the Quebec Remparts of the QMJHL. He also represented Canada at the 1984 World Junior Ice Hockey Championships, where he earned two assists in seven games.

Two days later, on June 11, the Whalers signed head coach Jack Evans and assistant coach Claude Larose to a three-year extension, through the 1987–88 season. In his first season with Hartford in 1983–84, Evans led the club to a 28–42–10 record, earning 70 points, which represented a 25-point improvement over the 1982–83 season.

On September 5, the club acquired goaltender Steve Weeks from the New York Rangers for future considerations. Weeks had a 10–11–2 record with a 3.98 GAA and a .864 save percentage with the Rangers during the 1983–84 season. In his career with the Rangers, Weeks had a 42–33–14 record with a 3.83 GAA and a .866 save percentage in 94 games from 1980 to 1984.

During the NHL Waiver Draft held on October 9, the Whalers selected right winger Dave Lumley from the Edmonton Oilers and defenseman Wally Weir from the Quebec Nordiques. Lumley scored six goals and 21 points in 56 games with the Oilers in 1983–84. In the playoffs, Lumley scored two goals and seven points in 19 games, helping the Oilers win the 1984 Stanley Cup Finals. His best season came in 1981–82, when Lumley scored 32 goals and 74 points in 66 games with Edmonton. Weir played in 25 games with Quebec in 1983–84, scoring two goals and five points. In five seasons with the Nordiques, Weir scored 19 goals and 58 points in 272 games, while accumulating 535 penalty minutes.

Regular season

October
The Whalers opened the season on the road at Madison Square Garden against the New York Rangers on October 11, as Sylvain Turgeon scored two goals in a 4–4 tie. Two nights later, the Whalers hosted the Boston Bruins in front of a sellout crowd of 14,817. Risto Siltanen was the hero for Hartford, as he scored the overtime winner in a 3–2 victory.

After losing their next game, on the road against the Boston Bruins, the Whalers won three games in a row, improving their record to 4–1–1, before heading out for a four-game western road trip. The Whalers split the four game road trip, opening with two losses against the Calgary Flames and Winnipeg Jets, before rebounding with wins over the Minnesota North Stars and Chicago Black Hawks.

The Whalers finished the month of October with a loss to the Quebec Nordiques on Halloween night. Overall, Hartford earned a record of 6–4–1 as the club earned 13 points. Hartford sat in a tie for first place in the Adams Division with the Montreal Canadiens.

November
Hartford began November with a blowout loss, losing 8–1 to the Buffalo Sabres on November 2. The next night, the Whalers tied the Sabres 4–4 on home ice during the second game of their home and home series. Four nights later, on November 7, the Whalers were shutout for the first time of the season, losing 3–0 to the Winnipeg Jets, dropping their overall record to 6–6–2.

On November 10, Greg Millen stopped all 28 shots he faced, as the Whalers earned their first shutout of the season, defeating the Quebec Nordiques 1–0. Following this victory, the Whalers lost their next three games, including a 7–0 loss to the Chicago Black Hawks. During this slump, on November 16, the Whalers acquired forward Pat Boutette from the Pittsburgh Penguins for Ville Siren. Boutette had previously played with the Whalers from 1979 to 1981. At the time of the trade, Boutette had a goal and four points in 14 games with the Penguins.

The Whalers ended their three-game losing skid with a 9–3 victory over the Pittsburgh Penguins on November 22, as Mark Johnson and Greg Malone each scored two goals. Following a 4–4 against the Philadelphia Flyers, Hartford dropped their final two games of the month.

Hartford struggled to a 2–7–2 record during November, bringing their overall record to 8–11–3 through their first 19 games. The Whalers dropped to last place in the Adams Division, three points behind the fourth place Buffalo Sabres.

December
The losses continued at the beginning of December, as Hartford lost two road games to begin the month, 8–4 to the Quebec Nordiques and 9–3 to the Montreal Canadiens.

Hartford snapped out of their skid on December 5, defeating the Montreal Canadiens 5–3, which began a five-game unbeaten streak, in which the Whalers posted a 4–0–1 record, bringing their record to 12–13–4.

The Whalers were unable to continue their winning ways, as the club dropped their final two games before Christmas, including a 10–5 loss to the Montreal Canadiens. After the Christmas break, the club defeated the New Jersey Devils 5–3 to snap their losing streak, however, Hartford would drop their final two games of the month.

Hartford earned a record of 5–6–1 during December. Their overall record was 13–17–4, as the team had earned 30 points. The Whalers remained in last place in the Adams Division, eight points behind the Quebec Nordiques for the fourth and final playoff position.

January
The Whalers opened 1985 with a 7–3 loss to the Quebec Nordiques on January 2, dropping their third consecutive game, and their fifth loss in their past six games.

The next night, the Whalers snapped their losing streak with a 6–2 win over the Detroit Red Wings, which started a four-game unbeaten streak for the team (3-0-1). Following a 4–4 tie against the Buffalo Sabres on January 8, the Whalers record improved to 16–18–5. The Whalers were within four points of the Boston Bruins for the final playoff position in the Adams Division.

The Whalers lost their next five games before snapping their skid with a 3–2 win over the Boston Bruins on January 26. The club then lost their next two games to close out January with seven losses in their final eight games.

Hartford slumped to a 4–8–1 during 13 games in January, bringing their record to 17–25–5 through January. The club continued to be in last place, 16 points behind the fourth place Boston Bruins.

February
The losses continued to pile up during February, as Hartford posted a 0–5–1 record during their first six games of the month. Among the lowlights was a 10–4 loss to the Quebec Nordiques on February 10.

Hartford ended their losing streak on February 14, as Steve Weeks made 19 saves, as the Whalers shutout the New Jersey Devils 4–0. This began a stretch in which the club posted a 3–1–1 record in a five-game stretch.

On February 21, the Whalers were involved in a blockbuster trade, as Hartford traded goaltender Greg Millen and centre Mark Johnson to the St. Louis Blues for goaltender Mike Liut and future considerations. Liut had a 12–12–6 record with a 3.83 GAA and a .880 save percentage with St. Louis during the 1984–85 season. Liut led the NHL in victories during the 1979–80 season with 32, and in 1980–81, he won the Lester B. Pearson Award, given annually to the most outstanding player in the NHL. In 347 career games with the Blues, Liut was 151–133–52 with a 3.59 GAA and a .885 save percentage.

On February 23, Liut appeared in his first game with the Whalers, as he made 30 saves, however, the club lost to the Los Angeles Kings 2–1 in overtime. Hartford continued to struggle to close out the month, as they dropped their remaining two games.

The Whalers earned a record of 3–9–2 in February, dropping their overall record to 20–34–7. Hartford remained out of the playoff picture, 15 points behind the fourth place Boston Bruins.

March/April
Hartford opened March with a 4–1 win over the New Jersey Devils behind a 28-save performance by Steve Weeks. Following the win, the Whalers would go on a six-game winless skid (0-4-2).

On March 11, the Whalers acquired center Dean Evason and goaltender Peter Sidorkiewicz from the Washington Capitals in exchange for David Jensen. Evason had three goals and seven points in 15 games with the Capitals, while Sidorkiewicz was already playing with the Whalers AHL affiliate, the Binghamton Whalers, as the Capitals and Hartford shared the affiliate.

On March 16, Steve Weeks made 28 saves in a 5–0 shutout victory over the St. Louis Blues, ending Hartford's winless streak. This victory kicked off a seven-game winning streak for Hartford. On March 17, Mike Liut earned his first win in a Whalers uniform, as Hartford beat the Pittsburgh Penguins 4–3. On March 29, the final game of the winning streak, Ray Ferraro scored a hat trick in a wild 8–7 win over the Edmonton Oilers.

Hartford finished the season with a 2–3–0 record in their final five games after the winning streak. The team earned a record of 10–7–2 in their final 19 games. The overall record of the Whalers was 30–41–9, as Hartford earned 69 points, and finished in last place in the Adams Division, 13 points behind the fourth place Boston Bruins. This was the fifth consecutive season that the team failed the qualify for the post-season.

Final standings

Schedule and results

Playoffs
The Whalers failed to qualify for the post-season for the fifth consecutive season. The Whalers finished with a 30-41-9 record, earning 69 points, which was their highest point total since the 1979-80 season. Hartford finished 13 points behind the fourth place Boston Bruins for the final playoff position in the Adams Division.

Player statistics

Awards and records

Transactions
The Whalers were involved in the following transactions during the 1984–85 season.

Trades

Waivers

Free agents

Draft picks
Hartford's draft picks at the 1984 NHL Entry Draft held at the Montreal Forum in Montreal, Quebec.

Farm teams

See also
1984–85 NHL season

References

External links

Hartford Whalers seasons
Hartford
Hartford
Hartford
Hartford